Giancarlo Tesini (born 5 February 1929) is an Italian Christian Democrat politician and sports director.

He was a deputy from 1972 to 1992 and served as minister without portfolio for scientific and technological research in the first and second cabinet of Giovanni Spadolini and as minister of transport in the first cabinet of Giuliano Amato.

He was also president of Fortitudo Pallacanestro Bologna and Lega Basket.

References

External links

1929 births
Living people
Politicians from Bologna
Christian Democracy (Italy) politicians
Government ministers of Italy
Deputies of Legislature VI of Italy
Deputies of Legislature VII of Italy
Deputies of Legislature VIII of Italy
Deputies of Legislature IX of Italy
Deputies of Legislature X of Italy
Italian sports directors
Transport ministers of Italy